Pinnaroo may refer to:

Queensland
Pinnaroo Cemetery and Crematorium, Brisbane

South Australia
Pinnaroo, South Australia, a town and locality
District Council of Pinnaroo (1908-1920), a former local government area which was renamed in 1920 as the District Council of Lameroo
District Council of Pinnaroo, a former local government area which merged with the District Council of Lameroo to create the South Mallee District Council
Hundred of Pinnaroo, a cadastral unit

See also
Pinnaroo railway line (disambiguation)
Lake Pinaroo
Parish of Pinaroo